Elliott Seabrooke (1886–1950) was a British landscape and still-life painter.  His work is in the permanent collection of the Tate.

Seabrooke was born in Upton Park, Essex (now London). He trained at the Slade School of Fine Art from 1906 to 1911.

References

British artists
1886 births
1950 deaths
Alumni of the Slade School of Fine Art
People from Upton Park, London
British landscape artists
British still life painters